22 Andromedae, abbreviated 22 And, is a single star in the constellation Andromeda. 22 Andromedae is the Flamsteed designation. It is visible to the naked eye with an apparent visual magnitude of 5.04. The distance to 22 And can be estimated from its annual parallax shift of just , which shows it to be around 1,500 light years away. It is moving closer to the Earth with a heliocentric radial velocity of −8.2 km/s.

This is a bright giant with a stellar classification of F5 II. Gray et al. (2001) classify it as F5 Ib–II metal-weak, with the metallic lines matching a class of F0 whereas hydrogen lines match an F5. It is around 62 million years old with a projected rotational velocity of 46. The star has six times the mass of the Sun and has expanded to about 17 times the Sun's radius. It is radiating 1,436 times the Sun's luminosity from its photosphere at an effective temperature of 6,270 km/s.

References

F-type bright giants
Andromeda (constellation)
Durchmusterung objects
Andromedae, 22
000571
000841
0027